Luke Martin Higgins (May 3, 1921 – October 11, 1991) was an American football guard who played one season with the Baltimore Colts of the All-America Football Conference. He was drafted by the Cleveland Rams in the 23rd round of the 1945 NFL Draft. He played college football at the University of Notre Dame and attended Cliffside Park High School in Cliffside Park, New Jersey.

Professional career
Higgins was selected by the Cleveland Rams with the 235th pick in the 1945 NFL Draft.

Baltimore Colts
Higgins played in eleven games for the Baltimore Colts in 1947.

Personal life
Higgins served in the United States Military during World War II and was awarded a Purple Heart.

References

External links
Just Sports Stats

1921 births
1991 deaths
Players of American football from New Jersey
American football guards
Cliffside Park High School alumni
Notre Dame Fighting Irish football players
Baltimore Colts (1947–1950) players
American military personnel of World War II
People from Edgewater, New Jersey
Sportspeople from Bergen County, New Jersey